Some national leaders, including heads of state and heads of government have tested positive for COVID-19 while in office.
  Alexander Lukashenko, President of Belarus
  Jair Bolsonaro, President of Brazil
  Justin Trudeau, Prime Minister of Canada
  Emmanuel Macron, President of France
 Jean Castex, Prime Minister of France
  Alejandro Giammattei, President of Guatemala
  Juan Orlando Hernández, President of Honduras 
  Micheál Martin, Taoiseach of Ireland
  Andrés Manuel López Obrador, President of Mexico
  Prince Albert II of Monaco, Prince of Monaco
  James Marape, Prime Minister of Papua New Guinea
  Imran Khan, Prime Minister of Pakistan
  Andrzej Duda, President of Poland
  António Costa, Prime Minister of Portugal
  Mikhail Mishustin, Prime Minister (head of government) of Russia.
  Recep Tayyip Erdoğan, President of Turkey
  Volodymyr Zelenskyy, President of Ukraine
  Boris Johnson, Prime Minister of the United Kingdom
  / Elizabeth II, Queen of the United Kingdom of Great Britain and Northern Ireland, Australia, New Zealand, Canada, Jamaica, Grenada, The Bahamas, Papua New Guinea, Tuvalu, Solomon Islands, St. Lucia, Beliza, St. Kitts and Nevis, Antigua and Barbuda, St. Vincent and the Grenadines and the Commonwelath
  Donald Trump, President of the United States (October 2020)
  Naftali Bennett, Prime Minister of Israel
  Mohammed VI, King of Morocco
  Bongbong Marcos, President of the Philippines
 Joe Biden, President of the United States (July 2022)

References

COVID-19 pandemic-related lists
Lists of heads of government